Budel may refer to:

 Budel, village in the Dutch province of North Brabant
 Budel, Poland, village in the Masovian Voivodeship in east-central Poland
 Alessandro Budel, Italian footballer
 Julius Büdel (1903–1983), German geomorphologist
 Büdel Islands, at Antarctica
 Kempen Airport, also known as Budel Airport